is a Japanese supernatural manga series written and illustrated by Shūzō Oshimi.  The series is published by Kodansha in Japan and by Kodansha USA in the United States.

Release
Shūzō Oshimi began serializing Happiness in the March 2015 issue of Kodansha's shōnen manga magazine Bessatsu Shōnen Magazine on 9 February 2015. Ten volumes have been released .

Kodansha USA announced their license to the series at their panel at Anime Central on 21 May 2016.

Volumes

References

External links
  at Bessatsu Shōnen Magazine 
 

Dark fantasy anime and manga
Kodansha manga
Shōnen manga
Shūzō Oshimi
Supernatural anime and manga
Vampires in anime and manga